Hans Oskar Evju (6 January 1886 – 20 June 1967) was a Norwegian politician for the Centre Party.

He was born in Sandsvær.

He was elected to the Norwegian Parliament from Buskerud in 1950, and was re-elected on one occasion. He had previously served as a deputy representative during the term 1928–1930 and 1931–1933.

Evju was a long-time member of Ytre Sandsvær municipal council, most notably serving as mayor in the period 1931–1934. He was also a member of Buskerud county council.

Outside politics he worked with farming and forestry.

References

1886 births
1967 deaths
Centre Party (Norway) politicians
Members of the Storting
Mayors of places in Buskerud
20th-century Norwegian politicians